Brassavola angustata is a species of orchid native to Trinidad & Tobago, Guyana, Venezuela, Suriname, and Roraima. In Jones' revision of Brassavola, he placed it in B. sect. Sessilabia.

References

Flora of Trinidad and Tobago
Orchids of Guyana
Orchids of Venezuela
Orchids of Suriname
Orchids of Brazil
Plants described in 1836
angustata
Flora without expected TNC conservation status